Les Inrockuptibles is a French cultural magazine. Started as a monthly in 1986, it became weekly in 1995. As of 2021, it has gone back to a monthly format. In the beginning, rock music was the magazine's primary focus, though every issue included articles on other topics, generally with a left-wing perspective.

The magazine has produced several tribute records, including I'm Your Fan to Leonard Cohen in 1991, The Smiths Is Dead in 1996, and Monsieur Gainsbourg Revisited in 2006. Since 1988, it has included CD compilations as part of individual issues.

Guillaume B. Decherf, a music critic and journalist for the magazine, was killed during the November 2015 Paris attacks at an Eagles of Death Metal concert at the Bataclan.

There is a Spanish-language edition of the magazine made in Argentina, named Los Inrockuptibles.

References

External links
  (in French)]
 Argentine edition (archived)

1986 establishments in France
Music magazines published in France
Magazines established in 1986
Rock music mass media
November 2015 Paris attacks
Socialist magazines
Weekly magazines published in France
Monthly magazines published in France
Magazines published in Paris